Cyprus competed at the 2018 Winter Olympics in Pyeongchang, South Korea, from 9 to 25 February 2018, with one competitor.

Competitors
The following is the list of number of competitors participating in the Cypriot delegation per sport.

Alpine skiing 

Cyprus has qualified one male athlete.

See also
Cyprus at the 2018 Summer Youth Olympics
 Sport in Cyprus
 Cyprus at the Olympics
 Cyprus at the 2014 Winter Olympics

References

Nations at the 2018 Winter Olympics
2018
2018 in Cypriot sport